Kilsyth New station served the town of Kilsyth in Scotland. The station was on the Kilsyth and Bonnybridge Railway.

History 
The station opened on 2 July 1888. It was located on the corner of Kingston Road and Station Road and was a three-storey building. The station was demolished after the railway was closed and is now used as car repair workshop. The station closed on 1 February 1935.

References

External links 

Disused railway stations in North Lanarkshire
Former Kilsyth and Bonnybridge Railway stations
Railway stations in Great Britain opened in 1888
Railway stations in Great Britain closed in 1935
1888 establishments in Scotland
1935 disestablishments in Scotland
Kilsyth